Yahoo! Personals was an online dating service provided by Yahoo!.

Features
The Yahoo! Personals editions were designed in local languages. Contacting a member through Yahoo! Personals required a paid subscription to Yahoo! Personals. Yahoo! Personals ceased operations on July 21, 2010.

See also
Comparison of online dating services
Timeline of online dating services
List of Yahoo!-owned sites and services

References

External links
 Yahoo! Personals

Personals
Online dating services of the United States